Jamie Murray and Bruno Soares were the defending champions, but lost in the first round to Robert Lindstedt and Frances Tiafoe.

Mischa and Alexander Zverev won the title, defeating Artem Sitak and Austin Krajicek in the final, 2–6, 7–6(7–4), [10–5].

Seeds

Draw

Draw

Qualifying

Seeds

Qualifiers
  Peter Gojowczyk /  Kevin Krawietz

Qualifying draw

References

External Links
 Main draw
 Qualifying draw

Abierto Mexicano Telcel - Doubles
Men's Doubles